The 2019 NASCAR Pinty's Series is the thirteenth season of the Pinty's Series, the national stock car racing series in Canada sanctioned by NASCAR. It began with the Clarington 200 at Canadian Tire Motorsport Park on 19 May and concluded with the Pinty's Fall Brawl at Jukasa Motor Speedway on 28 September.

Louis-Philippe Dumoulin entered the season as the defending Drivers' champion. Andrew Ranger won the championship, eleven points ahead of Kevin Lacroix.

Drivers

Schedule
On 10 January 2019, NASCAR announced the 2019 schedule.

Notes

Results and standings

Races

Drivers' championship

(key) Bold – Pole position awarded by time. Italics – Pole position set by final practice results or Owners' points. * – Most laps led.

See also

2019 Monster Energy NASCAR Cup Series
2019 NASCAR Xfinity Series
2019 NASCAR Gander Outdoors Truck Series
2019 ARCA Menards Series
2019 NASCAR K&N Pro Series East
2019 NASCAR K&N Pro Series West
2019 NASCAR Whelen Modified Tour
2019 NASCAR PEAK Mexico Series
2019 NASCAR Whelen Euro Series

References

External links

Pinty's Series Standings and Statistics for 2019

NASCAR Pinty's Series
NASCAR Pinty's Series